Ambrein is a triterpene alcohol that is the chief constituent of ambergris, a secretion from the digestive system of the sperm whale, and has been suggested as the possible active component producing the supposed aphrodisiac effects of ambergris. Although ambrein itself is odorless, it serves as the biological precursor for a number of aromatic derivatives such as ambroxan and is thought to possess fixative properties for other odorants.

It has been shown to act as an analgesic and it has been proven to increase sexual behavior in rats, providing some support for its traditional aphrodisiac use.

Apart from its supposed aphrodisiac effects, ambrein has been shown to decrease spontaneous contractions of smooth muscles in rats, guinea pigs, and rabbits. It is able to reduce these contractions by serving as an antagonist and interfering with the Ca2+ ions from outside of the cell.

Discovery
In 1946, Ruzicka and Lardon "established that the fragrance of ambergris is based on the triterpene (named) ambrein".

Biosynthesis 
Ambrein is synthesized from common triterpenoid precursor squalene. The squalene-hopene cyclase (SHC) catalyzes cyclization of squalene into the monocyclic 3-deoxyachilleol A. Tetraprenyl-beta-curcumene synthase (BmeTC) converts 3-deoxyachilleol A into the tricyclic ambrein.

References 

Perfume ingredients
Whale products
Animal glandular products
Triterpenes
Decalins
Tertiary alcohols